Joseph Evans Sperry  (1854–1930) was an American architect, noted for designing buildings in Baltimore. He was born in Georgetown, South Carolina and later relocated to Baltimore, Maryland, where he partnered with James Bosley Noel Wyatt to form the architectural firm Wyatt and Sperry.  Their affiliation lasted from 1878 to 1887.  The two probably became acquainted while working in the office of Architect, E. Francis Baldwin, where he worked from 1872 until 1876.  With Wyatt, he designed a number of buildings around Baltimore before breaking off on his own.  Sperry became one of Baltimore's leading architects, designing many public buildings, including churches, hospitals, and banks.  In 1914 he was named a Fellow of the American Institute of Architects.  Sperry also designed several buildings at Johns Hopkins University and one building at West Virginia University. Sperry's most famous building is probably the Emerson "Bromo-Seltzer" Tower in Baltimore.  Sperry's buildings were designed in a variety of styles, but overall were eclectic.  Sperry practiced architecture independently from 1888 until he died in 1930.

Selected works
1891: Equitable Building, Baltimore, Maryland
1892: The Eutaw Place Temple of congregation Oheb Shalom
1896: Brewers Exchange, Baltimore, Maryland
1897: St. Mark's Lutheran Church, Baltimore, Maryland
1911: Emerson "Bromo-Seltzer" Tower, Baltimore, Maryland
1914: Maryland Hall at Johns Hopkins University's Whiting School of Engineering
1917: Whitehall, Narragansett, Rhode Island
1930: Young Men's and Young Women's Hebrew Association Building, Baltimore, Maryland

References 

Withey, Henry F., A.I.A. and Elsie Raburn Withey, 1956.  Biographical Dictionary of American Architects (Deceased), (New Age Publishing Company, Los Angeles), 565.

External links

 Biography of Joseph Evans Sperry, Baltimore Architecture Foundation
 Baltimore Dead Architects Society

19th-century American architects
Architects from Baltimore
Fellows of the American Institute of Architects
1854 births
1930 deaths
20th-century American architects